Virgile is a given name. Notable persons with that name include:

Virgile Barel (1889-1979), French politician
Virgile Bruni (born 1989), French rugby union player
Virgile Boumelaha (born 1983), French football player
François-Virgile Dubillard (1845-1914), French Roman Catholic cardinal
Virgile Gaillard, French footplayer player
Virgile Lacombe (born 1984), French rugby union player
Virgil Partch (1916–1984), American cartoonist
Virgile Piechocki (born 1997), French footballer
Virgile Reset (born 1985), French football player
Virgile Rossel (1858-1933), Swiss jurist and politician
Antoine Virgile Schneider (1779-1847), French politician
Virgile Vandeput (born 1994), Flemish-Israeli alpine skier

See also
Virgule (disambiguation)
Virgil (disambiguation)